Sakkarang is a 2016 Sri Lankan historical film drama directed by Daramasena Pathiraja and produced by H. D. Premasiri for Cine Sarasavi. It stars Bimal Jayakody and Prasidini Athapaththu in lead roles, accompanied by Pubudu Chathuranga and Nita Fernando. Music composed of Nadeeka Guruge.

Cast
 Bimal Jayakody as Sube
 Prasidini Athapaththu as Rathi
 Pubudu Chathuranga as Milton
 Nita Fernando
 Darshani Athapaththu
 Cyril Wickramage as Pitawela Gurun
 Chamila Peiris
 Gayan Wickramathilake as Basnayake Nilame
 Sarath Kothalawala as Dingiri Banda
 Shyam Fernando as Monk Rathnapala 
 Thusitha Laknath as Rana
 W. Jayasiri as Jeramias
 Lakshman Mendis as Arachchila
 Shamila Nimanthi Fernando as Jayani
 Anura Bandara Rajaguru as Weda rala
 D.B. Gangodathenna

Synopsis
The film follows the story of a community of traditional dancers who lived in the hinterland of colonial Ceylon. Their duty is to perform in the annual festival of the Temple of the Tooth Relic. The narrative, which has a romantic and lyrical style, is set between two rebellions against colonial rule. It concerns the story of Sube, the chief dancer (Bimal) and Rathi, his enterprising wife (Prasidini). Their story charts the struggle of this marginal and oppressed caste community for its roots, rights, heritage and place in the world, while the country is going through a tortuous transformation from feudalism to modernity.

References

External links

සක්කාරං බක් මහේ

2016 films